Monroe County Courthouse is a historic county courthouse located in Stroudsburg, Pennsylvania. It is in the Romanesque Revival style. An identically sized addition was built in 1934, as a Public Works Administration project.

It was added to the National Register of Historic Places in 1979.

See also
 List of state and county courthouses in Pennsylvania

References

County courthouses in Pennsylvania
Courthouses on the National Register of Historic Places in Pennsylvania
Romanesque Revival architecture in Pennsylvania
Government buildings completed in 1890
Buildings and structures in Monroe County, Pennsylvania
National Register of Historic Places in Monroe County, Pennsylvania